Feira Nova may refer to:

 Feira Nova, Pernambuco, a city in Pernambuco, Brazil
 Feira Nova, Sergipe, a city in Sergipe, Brazil
 Feira Nova Hipermercados, a Portuguese supermarket chain operated by Grupo Jerónimo Martins